Sarah Wilson is a professor at the Courtauld Institute, London.  In 1997, Wilson was made Chevalier des Arts et des Lettres by the French Government for services to French art and culture.

Selected publications
The Visual World of French Theory: Figurations, Yale University Press, 2010.
Matisse, Barcelona, Ediciones Poligrafa, 2009. (English and Spanish editions)
‘Pierre Klossowski, epiphanies and secrets’, Pierre Klossowski, ed. Sarah Wilson Whitechapel Art Gallery and Hatje Cantz.
‘Poststructuralism', Companion to Contemporary Art since 1945, ed. Amelia Jones, Oxford, 2005 Blackwell Companions to Art History.

See also
Women in the art history field

References

External links
Interview with Professor Sarah Wilson, The Courtauld Institute of Art. Followed after Opening of The Exhibition: Dictionary Of An Artist | The Drawings Of Viktor Pivovarov. 18 January 2012.
Sarah Wilson's personal website.

Living people
Academics of the Courtauld Institute of Art
Year of birth missing (living people)
Alumni of the University of Oxford
Alumni of the Courtauld Institute of Art
Women art historians
British art historians
British women historians